Beijing Show City Times Entertainment Ltd. (北京少城時代文化傳播有限公司), abbreviated as Show City Times (少城時代), is a Chinese music company established by Chinese singer Jane Zhang and her ex-boyfriend Michael Feng. The company's business involves talent management, record production, publicity and other fields.

After filing a divorce with Michael Feng in 2018, Jane Zhang left the company and launched out into a new personal studio for herself.

Artists 

 Alex
Boss Shady
 Jocelyn Chan
 Liang Bo
 Liu Meilin
 Pan Chen
 QIO
 Su Lisheng
 Elvis Wang
 Reno Wang
 Wen Wei
 Xu Xinwen
 Zhang Liyin
 Xia Hanyu

Former artists 

 Gary Chaw (2012-2013)
 Jane Zhang (2013-2018)

References

External links 
 Official site

Companies based in Beijing
Entertainment companies of China
Talent agencies of China